Shulan is a county-level city in northern Jilin province, Northeast China. It falls under the administration of Jilin City,  to the south-southwest.

Administrative divisions
Shulan is divided into 5 subdistricts, 10 towns, and 5 townships. The city is also home to a National Economic and Technological Development Zone. The following table shows the township-level subdivisions of Shulan:

Geography 
The city spans an area of approximately 4,557 square kilometers in area, bounded by the Songhua River to its west. The Hulan River also flows through the city. The city has an average elevation of 740 meters in height. Shulan is home to a total of 318 species of animals which are classified as protected by the government, including sables, tigers, oriental storks, black storks, Asian black bears, yellow-throated martens, lynx, red deer, hazel grouse, Siberian cranes, swans, and various types of hawks and eagles.

Climate 
The average annual temperature of Shulan 4.3 °C, and the annual precipitation averages 683 millimeters.

History
From the Xia dynasty through the Qin dynasty, the region of present-day Shulan was inhabited by the Sushen People. Afterwards, during the Han dynasty, the area fell under the jurisdiction of the Xuantu Commandery. Upon the establishment of the Dongdan Kingdom, the area began inhabited by the Jurchen People.

Shulan's historical sites include the tombs of Wanyan Xiyin, the erstwhile "Chief Shaman" of the Jurchens and, later, the chief minister of the early Jin Empire, and his family members. Since 1961, they have been listed on the provincial register of the protected historical sites.

During the Qing dynasty, the so-called Outer Willow Palisade, separating the Mongolian and Manchurian lands to the west and east respectively, ended near the town of Fate within today's Shulan.

Economy 
Like much of China, Shulan experienced vast economic growth throughout the 2000s, with the city's GDP increasing from 4.309 billion Renminbi in 2005 to 12.801 by 2010. During this time, the city's average wages also rose dramatically, from 8,039 Renminbi in 2005 to 22,896 Renminbi five years later. The city's GDP peaked in 2014 at 21.052 billion Renminbi, and has remained stable at approximately 20 billion during the latter 2010's. During this economic slowdown, the Shulan's tertiary sector has grown in importance, accounting for 53.7% of the city's GDP as of 2018.

Agriculture 
As of 2018, the city's crop planting area is 134,000 hectares, including 48,000 hectares of rice, 79,000 hectares of corn, and 77,000 hectares of soybeans, and the city achieved total grain output of 914,000 tons. Shulan's animal husbandry sector includes 1.222 million live pigs, 327,000 heads of cattle, 1.201 million heads of chickens, and 1.806 million heads of swan. The city has also developed a considerable forestry industry.

Natural Resources 
Mineral deposits in Shulan include lignite, silica, white granite, and peat. The city also has China's only significant deposit of ball clay. Shulan's proven basic reserves of coal are 211 million tons, mainly lignite.  The proven reserves of molybdenum in the city are 710,300 tons, which are mainly distributed in a few small towns. The city also has proven reserves totaling 97.097 million tons of ball clay, 5.67 million cubic meters of basalt, and about 200 million cubic meters of granite. There is also considerable reserves of mineral water.

Education 
There are 184 schools in the city, including 4 high schools, 1 vocational high school, 20 junior high schools, 95 primary schools, and 1 special education school. The city has a total of 53,000 students.

Transportation 
Key roadways which pass through Shulan include China National Highway 202, Jilin Provincial Highway 204, and Jilin Provincial Highway 205. The Labin Railway and the Jilin-Shulan Railway pass through the city. Major railway stations in the city include the Fengguang, Jishu, Dongfu, Ma'anling, Shangying, Xiaocheng, Shuiqiliu, Ping'an, and Shulan stations.

References

External links
 Shulan City Government official site 

Cities in Jilin
County-level divisions of Jilin
Jilin City